Waldeck is an electoral constituency (German: Wahlkreis) represented in the Bundestag. It elects one member via first-past-the-post voting. Under the current constituency numbering system, it is designated as constituency 167. It is located in northern Hesse, comprising most of the Landkreis Kassel district and the northern part of the Waldeck-Frankenberg district.

Waldeck was created for the inaugural 1949 federal election. Since 2017, it has been represented by Esther Dilcher of the Social Democratic Party (SPD).

Geography
Waldeck is located in northern Hesse. As of the 2021 federal election, it comprises the entirety of the Landkreis Kassel district excluding the municipalities of Ahnatal, Espenau, Fuldabrück, Fuldatal, Helsa, Kaufungen, Lohfelden, Nieste, Niestetal, Söhrewald, and Vellmar, as well as the entirety of the Waldeck-Frankenberg district excluding the municipalities of Allendorf (Eder), Battenberg (Eder), Bromskirchen, Burgwald, Frankenau, Frankenberg, Gemünden (Wohra), Haina, Hatzfeld, Rosenthal, and Vöhl.

History
Waldeck was created in 1949. In the 1949 election, it was Hesse constituency 1 in the numbering system. From 1953 through 1976, it was number 126. From 1980 through 1998, it was number 124. In the 2002 and 2005 elections, it was number 169. In the 2009 election, it was number 168. Since 2013, it has been number 167.

Originally, the constituency comprised the districts of Waldeck, Hofgeismar, and Wolfhagen. In the 1972 election, it comprised the Waldeck district and the municipalities of Breuna, Calden, Emstal, Grebenstein, Habichtswald, Hofgeismar, Immenhausen, Karlshafen, Liebenau, Naumburg, Oberweser, Reinhardshagen, Trendelburg, Wahlsburg, Wolfhagen, and Zierenberg from the Landkreis Kassel district. In the 1976 election, it acquired borders very similar to its current configuration, but excluding the Baunatal and Schauenburg municipalities from Landkreis Kassel district. It acquired its current borders in the 2002 election.

Members
The constituency has been held by the Social Democratic Party (SPD) during all but three Bundestag terms since 1949. It was first represented by Karl Rüdiger of the Free Democratic Party (FDP) from 1949 until his death in 1951. Hans Merten of the SPD won the subsequent by-election, but was defeated at the 1953 federal election by FDP candidate Heinrich Fassbender. Karl Bechert of the SPD was elected in 1957 and served until 1972. He was succeeded by Rudi Walther, who served until 1994. Alfred Hartenbach was then representative until 2009. Ullrich Meßmer served one term from 2009 to 2013, when Thomas Viesehon of the Christian Democratic Union (CDU) won the constituency. Esther Dilcher regained it for the SPD in 2017 and was re-elected in 2021.

Election results

2021 election

2017 election

2013 election

2009 election

References

Federal electoral districts in Hesse
1949 establishments in West Germany
Constituencies established in 1949
Kassel (district)
Waldeck-Frankenberg